Indane-1,2,3-trione is the organic compound with the formula C6H4(CO)3.  The compound is the dehydrated derivative of C6H4(CO)2C(OH)2, known as ninhydrin, which is used to reveal fingerprints. 

Indane-1,2,3-trione, which reacts readily with nucleophiles (including water). Whereas for most carbonyl compounds, a carbonyl form is more stable than a product of water addition (hydrate), ninhydrin forms a stable hydrate of the central carbon because of the destabilizing effect of the adjacent carbonyl groups.

To generate the ninhydrin chromophore (2-(1,3-dioxoindan-2-yl)iminoindane-1,3-dione), the amine must condense to give a Schiff base. The reaction of ninhydrin with secondary amines gives an iminium salt, which is also coloured, generally being yellow–orange.

References

Triketones